Watcharachai Kaewsamrit (Thai:วชรชย แกวสมฤทธ) is a Thai Muay Thai fighter. He was the Sports Authority of Thailand Fighter of the Year in 2000.

Biography
Watcharachai started Muay Thai at the age of 12 under the name Pornchainoi Klomlaichang. He came to Bangkok in 1993 and made his Rajadamnern Stadium debut the next year.

Watcharachai retired in 2007 and went back to work on a farm for a time. In 2011 he accepted a job as a trainer for Tiger Muay Thai in Phuket. In 2012 Watcharachai opened his own camp where he trained high level fighter such as Kaimukkao Por.Thairongruangkamai and Palangpon Watcharachaigym. He later coached in other camps in Thailand and overseas, since 2019 he lives and teaches in Australia.

Titles and accomplishments
World Muay Thai Council
 1999 WMC World 118 lbs Champion
Rajadamnern Stadium 
 2001 Rajadamnern Stadium 126 lbs Champion
 2000 Rajadamnern Stadium Fighter of the Year
Professional Boxing Association of Thailand (PAT) 
 2000 Thailand 122 lbs Champion

Awards
 2000 Sports Authority of Thailand Fighter of the Year

Muay Thai record

|-  style="background:#cfc;"
| 2007-04-05 || Win ||align=left| Tuktathong Phetpayathai || Daorungchujarean, Rajadamnern Stadium || Bangkok, Thailand || KO (Elbow) || 3 ||

|-  style="background:#cfc;"
| 2007-02-15 || Win ||align=left| Kompayak Beamdesign || Rajadamnern Stadium || Bangkok, Thailand || Referee Stoppage || 5 ||

|-  style="background:#fbb;"
| 2006-09-04 || Loss ||align=left| Phet-Ek Sitjaopho || Rajadamnern Stadium || Bangkok, Thailand || Decision || 5 || 3:00

|-  style="background:#fbb;"
| 2006-07-06 || Loss ||align=left| Phet-Ek Sitjaopho || Rajadamnern Stadium || Bangkok, Thailand || Decision || 5 || 3:00

|-  style="background:#cfc;"
| 2006-05-24 || Win ||align=left| Saenchai Jirakriengkrai || Rajadamnern Stadium || Bangkok, Thailand || Decision || 5 || 3:00

|-  style="background:#fbb;"
| 2006-03-01 || Loss ||align=left| Srisuwan Sitkruwinai || Rajadamnern Stadium || Bangkok, Thailand || Decision || 5 || 3:00

|-  style="background:#fbb;"
| 2006-01-10 || Loss ||align=left| Dejsak Sor Thamphet || Lumpinee Stadium || Bangkok, Thailand || Decision || 5 || 3:00

|-  style="background:#cfc;"
| 2005-11-02 || Win ||align=left| Samingprai Kiatphonthip || Rajadamnern Stadium || Bangkok, Thailand || KO || 5 ||

|-  style="background:#cfc;"
| 2005-10-10 || Win ||align=left| Saengsamrit Jittigym || Rajadamnern Stadium || Bangkok, Thailand || KO || 2 ||

|-  style="background:#fbb;"
| 2005-09-05 || Loss ||align=left| Singtongnoi Sitsaengarun || Rajadamnern Stadium || Bangkok, Thailand || Decision || 5 || 3:00

|-  style="background:#cfc;"
| 2005-07-27 || Win ||align=left| Saenchai Jirakriengkrai || Rajadamnern Stadium || Bangkok, Thailand || Decision || 5 || 3:00

|-  style="background:#fbb;"
| 2005-05-30 || Loss ||align=left| Jomthong Chuwattana || Daorungchujarean, Rajadamnern Stadium || Bangkok, Thailand || Decision || 5 || 3:00

|-  style="background:#fbb;"
| 2005-04-07 || Loss ||align=left| Yodwanlop Por.Nattachai || Rajadamnern Stadium || Bangkok, Thailand || Decision || 5 || 3:00

|-  style="background:#fbb;"
| 2005-03-03 || Loss ||align=left| Dejsak Sor Thamphet || Rajadamnern Stadium || Bangkok, Thailand || KO (sweep to head kick) || 4 ||

|-  style="background:#fbb;"
| 2005-01-26 || Loss ||align=left| Saenchernglek Jirakriengkrai || Rajadamnern Stadium || Bangkok, Thailand || Decision || 5 || 3:00

|-  style="background:#fbb;"
| 2004-12-23 || Loss ||align=left| Lerdsila Chumpairtour ||Rajadamnern Stadium || Bangkok, Thailand || Decision || 5 || 3:00

|-  style="background:#fbb;"
| 2004-09-30 || Loss ||align=left| Mitthai Sor.Sakulphan || Rajadamnern Stadium || Bangkok, Thailand || Decision || 5 || 3:00

|-  style="background:#cfc;"
| 2004-09-01 || Win ||align=left| Wanchai Meenayothin || Rajadamnern Stadium || Bangkok, Thailand || KO || 3 ||

|-  style="background:#fbb;"
| 2004-06-17 || Loss ||align=left| Extra Pinsinchai|| Rajadamnern Stadium || Bangkok, Thailand || Decision || 5 || 3:00

|-  style="background:#cfc;"
| 2004-05-02 || Win ||align=left| Yohei Sakurai  || NJKF X-DUEL IV|| Tokyo, Japan || TKO (Towel thrown) || 3 || 2:35

|-  style="background:#cfc;"
| 2004-04-01 || Win ||align=left| Lerdsila Chumpairtour || Rajadamnern Stadium || Bangkok, Thailand || TKO || 3 ||

|-  style="background:#cfc;"
| 2004-03-18 || Win ||align=left| Nuaphet Sakhomsil || Rajadamnern Stadium || Bangkok, Thailand || Decision || 5 || 3:00

|-  style="background:#fbb;"
| 2004-01-27 || Loss ||align=left| Yodsanklai Fairtex || Petchpiya, Lumpinee Stadium || Bangkok, Thailand || TKO || 1 ||

|-  style="background:#cfc;"
| 2003-12-18 || Win ||align=left| Saksi Sit Or || Rajadamnern Stadium || Bangkok, Thailand || KO || 5 ||

|-  style="background:#fbb;"
| 2003-11-24 || Loss ||align=left| Lerdsila Chumpairtour ||Rajadamnern Stadium || Bangkok, Thailand || Decision || 5 || 3:00

|-  style="background:#cfc;"
| 2003-10-19 || Win ||align=left| Komphet || Channel 7  Stadium || Bangkok, Thailand || KO  || 1 ||

|-  style="background:#fbb;"
| 2003-08-14 || Loss ||align=left| Fahsuchon Sit-O ||Rajadamnern Stadium || Bangkok, Thailand || Decision || 5 || 3:00

|-  style="background:#fbb;"
| 2003-06-|| Loss ||align=left| Lerdsila Chumpairtour ||Rajadamnern Stadium || Bangkok, Thailand || Decision || 5 || 3:00

|-  style="background:#;"
| 2003-03-31 || ||align=left| Daoudon Sor.Suchart || Rajadamnern Stadium || Bangkok, Thailand || Decision || 5 || 3:00

|-  style="background:#fbb;"
| 2003-02-05 || Loss ||align=left| Chalermpol Kiatsunanta || Rajadamnern Stadium || Bangkok, Thailand || Decision || 5 || 3:00

|-  style="background:#cfc;"
| 2003-01-10 || Win ||align=left| Sangheeran Lukbanyai || Rajadamnern Stadium || Bangkok, Thailand || Decision || 5 || 3:00

|-  style="background:#cfc;"
| 2002- || Win ||align=left| Daoudon Sor.Suchart || Rajadamnern Stadium || Bangkok, Thailand || TKO || 4 ||

|-  style="background:#fbb;"
| 2002-12-03 || Loss||align=left| Kongpipop Petchyindee || Lumpinee Stadium || Bangkok, Thailand || Decision || 5 || 3:00

|-  style="background:#cfc;"
| 2002- || Win ||align=left| Sangheeran Lukbanyai || Rajadamnern Stadium || Bangkok, Thailand || Decision || 5 || 3:00

|-  style="background:#cfc;"
| 2002-10-30 || Win ||align=left| Yodbuangam Lukbanyai || Rajadamnern Stadium || Bangkok, Thailand || Decision || 5 || 3:00

|-  style="background:#cfc;"
| 2002-10-04 || Win ||align=left| Samranchai 96Peenang || Lumpinee Stadium || Bangkok, Thailand || Decision || 5 || 3:00

|-  style="background:#c5d2ea;"
| 2002- || Draw||align=left| Muangfahlek kiatwichian || Rajadamnern Stadium || Bangkok, Thailand || Decision || 5 || 3:00

|-  style="background:#cfc;"
| 2002- || Win||align=left| Tananchai Nakonthongpakview || Channel 7 Stadium || Bangkok, Thailand || Decision || 5 || 3:00

|-  style="background:#fbb;"
| 2002-06-23 || Loss ||align=left| Tananchai Nakonthongpakview || Channel 7 Stadium || Bangkok, Thailand || Decision || 5 || 3:00

|-  style="background:#fbb;"
| 2002-03-11 || Loss ||align=left| Sangheeran Lukbanyai || Rajadamnern Stadium || Bangkok, Thailand || TKO ||3  ||

|-  style="background:#cfc;"
| 2002- || Win||align=left| Sangheeran Lukbanyai || Rajadamnern Stadium || Bangkok, Thailand || Decision ||5  ||3:00

|-  style="background:#fbb;"
| 2001-12-30 || Loss ||align=left| Sangheeran Lukbanyai || Channel 7 Stadium  || Bangkok, Thailand || Decision || 5 || 3:00

|-  style="background:#fbb;"
| 2001-10-17 || Loss ||align=left| Nontachai Kiatwanlop || Rajadamnern Stadium || Bangkok, Thailand || Decision || 5 || 3:00

|-  style="background:#fbb;"
| 2001-09-05 || Loss ||align=left| Mitthai Sor.Sakulphan || Rajadamnern Stadium || Bangkok, Thailand || Decision || 5 || 3:00

|-  style="background:#cfc;"
| 2001-08- || Win ||align=left| Sangheeran Lukbanyai ||Lumpinee Stadium || Bangkok, Thailand || Decision || 5 || 3:00

|-  style="background:#fbb;"
| 2001-07-18 || Loss ||align=left| Noppakao Sauwanchat || Rajadamnern Stadium || Bangkok, Thailand || Decision || 5 || 3:00 
|-
! style=background:white colspan=9 |

|-  style="background:#fbb;"
| 2001-06- || Loss ||align=left| Pornpitak PhetUdomchai || Rajadamnern Stadium || Bangkok, Thailand || Decision || 5 || 3:00

|-  style="background:#cfc;"
| 2001-05-25 || Win ||align=left| Sangheeran Lukbanyai ||Lumpinee Stadium || Bangkok, Thailand || Decision || 5 || 3:00

|-  style="background:#fbb;"
| 2001-05-03 || Loss ||align=left| Nongbee Kiatyongyut || Rajadamnern Stadium || Bangkok, Thailand || Decision || 5 || 3:00

|-  style="background:#fbb;"
| 2001-02-27 || Loss ||align=left| Chanrit Sit Or || Lumpinee Stadium || Bangkok, Thailand || Decision || 5 || 3:00

|-  style="background:#cfc;"
| 2001-02-11 || Win ||align=left| Chinrat Chor.Watcharin  || Channel 7 Stadium || Bangkok, Thailand || KO || 5 ||

|-  style="background:#cfc;"
| 2001-01-17 || Win ||align=left| Noppakao Sauwanchat || Rajadamnern Stadium || Bangkok, Thailand || Decision || 5 || 3:00 
|-
! style=background:white colspan=9 |

|-  style="background:#cfc;"
| 2000-12-08 || Win ||align=left| Yodbuangam Lukbanyai || Lumpinee Stadium || Bangkok, Thailand || Decision || 5 || 3:00 
|-
! style=background:white colspan=9 |

|-  style="background:#cfc;"
| 2000-10-03 || Win ||align=left| Dokmaifai Tor.Sitthichai || Lumpinee Stadium || Bangkok, Thailand || KO || 4 ||

|-  style="background:#cfc;"
| 2000-09-12 || Win ||align=left| Orono MajesticGym || Lumpinee Stadium || Bangkok, Thailand || Decision || 5 || 3:00

|-  style="background:#cfc;"
| 2000-08-13 || Win ||align=left| Rungrawee Sor.Ploenchit ||  Rajadamnern Stadium|| Bangkok, Thailand || Decision || 5 || 3:00

|-  style="background:#cfc;"
| 2000-06-30 || Win ||align=left| Sangheeran Lukbanyai || Lumpinee Stadium || Bangkok, Thailand || Decision || 5 || 3:00

|-  style="background:#cfc;"
| 2000-05-30 || Win ||align=left| Saksit Sit-Or || Lumpinee Stadium|| Bangkok, Thailand || Decision || 5 || 3:00

|-  style="background:#cfc;"
| 2000-05-02 || Win ||align=left| Tananchai Nakonthongpakview || Lumpinee Stadium  || Bangkok, Thailand || KO || 4 ||

|-  style="background:#cfc;"
| 2000-04-14 || Win ||align=left| Jack || || New Zealand || Decision || 5 || 3:00

|-  style="background:#cfc;"
| 2000-03-31 || Win ||align=left| Phet-Ek Sor.Suwanpakdee || Lumpinee Stadium || Bangkok, Thailand || Decision || 5 || 3:00

|-  style="background:#cfc;"
| 2000-02-02 || Win ||align=left| Muangfahlek Kiatwichian || Rajadamnern Stadium|| Bangkok, Thailand || Decision || 5 || 3:00

|-  style="background:#cfc;"
| 1999-12-29 || Win ||align=left| Poolsawatlek Wor.Singsanae ||  || Bangkok, Thailand || Decision || 5 || 3:00

|-  style="background:#fbb;"
| 1999-10-29 || Loss ||align=left| Tananchai Nakonthongpakview || Lumpinee Stadium || Bangkok, Thailand || Decision || 5 || 3:00

|-  style="background:#c5d2ea;"
| 1999- || Draw||align=left|  Charlie Sochaitakmin || Rajadamnern Stadium || Bangkok, Thailand || Decision || 5 || 3:00

|-  style="background:#cfc;"
| 1999-07-23 || Win ||align=left| Duangsompong Por.Pongsawang || Lumpinee Stadium || Bangkok, Thailand || Decision || 5 || 3:00

|-  bgcolor=""
| 1999-05-19 || ||align=left| Rungrawee Sor.Ploenchit ||  || Bangkok, Thailand ||  ||  ||

|-  bgcolor=""
| 1998-12-23 || ||align=left| Lerdsila Chumpairtour ||  || Bangkok, Thailand ||  ||  ||

|-  style="background:#cfc;"
| 1998-10-10 || Win ||align=left| Chondan Technodusit ||  Omnoi Stadium - Isuzu Cup  || Bangkok, Thailand || Decision || 5 || 3:00

|-  style="background:#cfc;"
| 1998-03-23 || Win ||align=left| Damnoensak Saksurapong ||  Rajadamnern Stadium  || Bangkok, Thailand || Decision || 5 || 3:00 
|-
| colspan=9 | Legend:

See also 
List of male kickboxers

References

1989 births
Living people
Watcharachai Kaewsamrit
Watcharachai Kaewsamrit